The Snohomish County Executive is the head of the executive branch of Snohomish County, Washington. The position is subject to four-year terms (with a term limit of 3) and is a partisan office.

History

County voters approved the adoption of a home-rule charter for Snohomish County on November 6, 1979, creating the position of a county executive and a five-member county council. Prior to the adoption, the county government was led by three commissioners elected at-large. The new position took effect on May 1, 1980, with Willis Tucker elected as the first executive.

List of executives

List of elections

See also
King County Executive
Pierce County Executive
Whatcom County Executive

References

Notes

Citations

External links
Snohomish County Executive

Executive
County officials in Washington (state)
County executives in the United States